Lepidogalaxias salamandroides is a species of small fish of Western Australia. It is the only member of the family Lepidogalaxiidae and genus Lepidogalaxias.  Common names for this fish include salamanderfish and Shannon mudminnow. Although it is not a lungfish, it resembles lungfish in several respects, including its ability to survive dry seasons by burrowing into the sand.  It is on the IUCN Red List as Endangered.

Morphology
Lepidogalaxias salamandroides is small with females measuring up to 7 cm in length.  This species has a slender, elongate and cylindrical body. The colour is brownish-green on the upper parts, silver-speckled and blotched on the sides, very pale below, and the fin membranes are transparent. The reddish eyes are fixed, but the fish is able to move its neck in any direction.

Biology
The salamaderfish spawn in winter when water levels are highest. Females produce 100–400 eggs with a diameter of 1.1–1.3mm, which hatch into bottom-feeder larvae 5.5mm long.  Larvae and juveniles grow rapidly to gain fat stores to survive the summer drought period.  Individuals reach up to 5 years of age.

The salamanderfish is carnivorous, mainly feeding on aquatic insect larvae.

Range and habitat
It has a limited distribution in acidic pools of water in heathland peat flats of southwest Australia, between the Blackwood and Kent Rivers. This range is across a distance of 180 kilometres, in an area of Northcliffe, they are common in this region. Its habitat is semi-permanent water, small pools and streams that may be high in tannins and acidity (pH 3.0–6.5). They experience a range of water temperatures, daily changes of 16 to 32 degrees Celsius, in pools no deeper than 0.1 metres. The species rests on the bottom of the  water using elongated pelvic and rounded caudal fins.  These small and shallow pools may contain a population of around 150 individuals, are generally no larger than 600 square metres, and evaporate in the dry seasons. It is also unusual for its ability to survive desiccation by burrowing into sand, a process of aestivation, when the pools it lives in periodically evaporate.

Taxonomy
The species was first described in 1961 by Gerlof Fokko Mees. This author identified the species as belonging to the Galaxiidae, but the relationship to those species was in doubt. Lepidogalaxias salamandroides was eventually placed among the Osmeriformes as a monotypic arrangement, Lepidogalaxias (Lepidogalaxiidae), in 1991. This placement has been also challenged, and rightly so, as analyses of molecular data have shown that Lepidogalaxias is actually an old and isolated lineage basal to all other Euteleostei. The species is contained in the class Actinopterygii, ray-finned fish, and is sometimes given the taxonomic placements as Galaxiidae of the order Salmoniformes.

It is sometimes named as the mud minnow, long-finned Galaxias, scaled galaxias, or dwarf pencilfish, however mud minnow usually refers to Galaxiella munda. A further list of names refer to L. salamandroides as salamanderfish of Western Australia, West Australian salamanderfish, salamander fish, salmanderfish, and Shannon mudminnow.

References

External links

Euteleostei
Monotypic ray-finned fish genera
Freshwater fish of Australia
Vertebrates of Western Australia
Near threatened animals
Fish described in 1961
Taxa named by Gerlof Mees
Endemic fauna of Southwest Australia